Kents Pocket is a rural locality in the Scenic Rim Region, Queensland, Australia.

Geography
The Boonah–Fassifern Road (State Route 90) runs through from east to north.

History
The locality contains 10 households, in which 51.7% of the population are males and 48.3% of the population are females with a median age of 50, 12 years above the national average. The average weekly household income is $2,124, $688 above the national average.

Education 
There are no schools in Kents Pocket. The nearest government primary school is Boonah State School in neighbouring Boonah to the east. The nearest government secondary school is Boonah State High School also in Boonah.

References 

Scenic Rim Region
Localities in Queensland